The women's 400 metre freestyle event at the 2004 Olympic Games was contested at the Olympic Aquatic Centre of the Athens Olympic Sports Complex in Athens, Greece on August 15.

France's Laure Manaudou won the gold medal in this event, with a European record time of 4:05.34. The silver medal was awarded to Poland's Otylia Jędrzejczak, who finished behind Manaudou by half a second (0.50), in an outstanding time of 4:05.84. U.S. swimmer Kaitlin Sandeno, who earned a silver in the 400 m individual medley on the previous day, fought off a challenge from Romania's Camelia Potec in the final lap to take a bronze by two tenths of a second (0.20), clocking at 4:06.19.

Records
Prior to this competition, the existing world and Olympic records were as follows.

Results

Heats

Final

References

External links
Official Olympic Report

W
2004 in women's swimming
Women's events at the 2004 Summer Olympics